Nollig Castle is a ruin above the village of Lorch in Hesse, Germany.

Notes

Buildings and structures completed in 1300
Castles in Hesse
Ruined castles in Germany
Buildings and structures in Rheingau-Taunus-Kreis
Rheingau